Martin Gerstel (born June 26, 1941) is an Israeli businessman. He was the CEO and co-chairman of Alza Corp. Martin Gerstel founded ALZA Corp. and Itamar Medical Ltd. M

History

Gerstel attended Yale University from which he received his undergraduate degree. He went on to receive an MBA from Stanford Graduate School of Business.

Gerstel held the position of Co-CEO of Compugen Ltd. and chairman for Keddem Bioscience Ltd. He founded ALZA Corp at which he was a chief executive and financial officer. He is the chairman of Compugen (Israeli company), Evogene, Keddem Bioscience, Mada Ltd.

Gerstel is the co-founder and co-chairman of Itamar Medical, and serves as a director of Yissum Research Development Company of Hebrew University Ltd., Yeda Ltd. and the Foundation for the U.S. National Medals of Science and Technology.

Gerstel is a member of the Board of Governors and the Executive Committee of the Weizmann Institute of Science and the Board of Governors of The Hebrew University of Jerusalem. He is an advisor to the Burrill Life Science Funds and the board of the Israel-U.S. Binational Industrial Research and Development Foundation ("BIRD").

As of 2019 Gerstel is the CFO and a director of a cybersecurity company preventing DDoS attacks, MazeBolt Technologies Ltd.

References

External links
 "Martin Gerstel's back in business, this time in Israel" – Israel21c
 Martin S. Gerstel Profile – Forbes.com
 Evogene official site
 Itamar Medical official site
 Yissum official site
 Yeda official site

1941 births
American chief executives
Living people
American chairpersons of corporations
Israeli businesspeople
Weizmann Institute of Science
Yale University alumni
Stanford Graduate School of Business alumni